Prinses Margriet may refer to:-

Princess Margriet of the Netherlands (b 1943).
Prinses Margriet Army Base, Zwolle, Netherlands
Prinses Margriet Kanaal, a canal in the Netherlands
, a Dutch coaster in service 1943-54